"It's a Cowboy Lovin' Night" is a song written by Ronnie Rogers, and recorded by American country music artist Tanya Tucker.  It was released in April 1977 as the second single from the album Ridin' Rainbows.  The song reached #7 on the Billboard Hot Country Singles & Tracks chart.

Chart performance

References

Songs about cowboys and cowgirls
1977 singles
1977 songs
Tanya Tucker songs
Songs written by Ronnie Rogers
MCA Records singles
Song recordings produced by Jerry Crutchfield